Conn, the Shaughraun is a 1912 Australian silent film directed by Gaston Mervale starring Louise Lovely based on a popular play by Dion Boucicault. It is considered a lost film.

Plot
Kinchela, an unscrupulous land agent, determines to get possession of the land belonging to Robert Ffolliott and his sister Claire, who are his charges. He causes Robert to be sentenced to penal servitude by swearing information falsely that he is a Fenian. Robert escapes and returns home, and is again soon in the hands of Kinchela. But Conn, the shaughraun, intervenes, Robert is pardoned (as are all the Fenians), and Kinchela brought to justice.

References

External links

Synopsis of original play
Full text of original play

1912 films
Australian drama films
Australian black-and-white films
Australian silent feature films
Lost Australian films
1912 drama films
1912 lost films
Lost drama films
Films directed by Gaston Mervale
Silent drama films
1910s English-language films